During the 2002–03 English football season, Bradford City competed in the Football League First Division.

Season summary
Just after the end of the previous season, Bradford had been placed into administration, as a result of the collapse of ITV Digital, "six weeks of madness" in the transfer market in 2000 and the collapse of the sale of Benito Carbone (on weekly wages of £40,000) to Middlesbrough. The only way for Bradford, £13 million into debt, to move forward was to going into administration to try and save the club and find a buyer. Cuts had to be made, the most drastic being the cancelling of the contracts of sixteen members of the professional squad, leaving manager Nicky Law with five professionals with a handful of senior appearances among them and sixteen scholars.

After a summer of uncertainty, on 1 August the administrators managed to get creditors to accept a Creditors Voluntary Agreement, which would reschedule debts and reinstate the players, who had gone unpaid since April. One player not to return was Benito Carbone, who sacrificed a large chunk of the money owed to him on his contract and moved back to Italy. Chairman Richmond resigned from the board of directors on 10 August, after a reign of eight years. He was replaced as chairman by theme park magnate and new co-owner Gordon Gibb, who, along with Julian Rhodes, had completed a take-over of the club at the 11th hour before Bradford were due to lose their Football League status.

On 30 August, agreement was finally reached with the Professional Footballers' Association over payment owed to the players. With agreement having already been made with the creditors, this now allowed the Football League to return Bradford City's share in the League, effectively bringing the club out of administration.

With a transfer embargo in place, manager Nicky Law had to show an eye for a bargain and unearthed some raw talent. Youngsters Danny Forrest and Simon Francis emerged while Law worked the loan system to cope with an horrific list of injuries.

Bradford eventually finished the season in 19th place; given all that had happened off the field, this was to be considered a success.

Claus Jorgensen scored in eight consecutive away matches.

Final league table

Results
Bradford City's score comes first

Legend

Football League First Division

FA Cup

League Cup

First-team squad

Left club during season

Reserve squad

Transfers

In
 Steve Banks - Bolton Wanderers, loan
 Andy Gray - Nottingham Forest
 Michael Proctor - Sunderland, loan
 Harpal Singh - Leeds United, loan
 Stephen Warnock - Liverpool, loan
 Delroy Facey - Bolton Wanderers, loan
 Boaz Myhill - Aston Villa, loan

Out
 Jamie Lawrence - Walsall
 Benito Carbone - Como
 Eoin Jess - Nottingham Forest
 Gary Locke - Kilmarnock
 Dave Beasant - Wigan Athletic
 Damian Hatton - retired
 Graeme Tomlinson - Bedford Town
 Neil Bennett - Rochdale

Statistics

Starting 11
Considering starts in all competitions
 #17,  Aidan Davison, 35
 #34,  Simon Francis, 25
 #12,  Robert Molenaar, 30
 #18,  Lewis Emanuel, 26
 #14,  Gus Uhlenbeek, 44
 #2,  Peter Atherton, 25
 #3,  Andy Myers, 22
 #19,  Claus Bech Jorgensen, 29
 #6,  Mark Bower, 38
 #9,  Ashley Ward, 25
 #11,  Andy Gray, 46

References

Bradford City A.F.C. seasons
Bradford City